Pol Shekasteh is a village in Sangestan Rural District, in the Central District of Hamadan County, Hamadan Province, Iran. At the 2006 census, its population was 11, in 5 families.

References 

Populated places in Hamadan County